Rio Cauto can refer to:

 Cauto River, the longest river in Cuba
 Río Cauto, Cuba, a municipality and city in Granma Province, Cuba